Raimundo Ferreira Ramos Júnior (born 14 March 1970), known as Júnior or Júnior Baiano as he comes from the state of Bahia, is a former Brazilian professional footballer who played as a centre-back.

Club career
Born in Feira de Santana, Júnior began his career in the late 1980s, playing with Flamengo in the Campeonato Brasileiro. Over the course of the next 15 years, his career took him to Germany, China and all over Brazil. In Germany, he is best known for the ten-match ban that he received after punching an opponent in a match, which caused his club Werder Bremen to cancel his contract. He won the Campeonato Carioca twice in two stints with Flamengo in 1991 and 2004, as well as the Copa do Brasil and the Campeonato Brasileiro. He also won the Copa CONMEBOL and the Recopa Sul-Americana with São Paulo in 1994 and the Copa Libertadores with Palmeiras in 1999.

Júnior retired at the end of 2005 but in December 2006, he signed a professional contract with América (RJ) to save the club from relegation in the Campeonato Carioca in the beginning of 2007. He left for Brasiliense in the Série B that same year.

After a brief stint with Volta Redonda in 2009, Júnior went to Miami FC of the USL First Division, which is coached by his former Brazilian national teammate Zinho.

International career
Júnior Baiano earned 25 caps with the Brazil national team in 1997 and 1998, and was a member of the Brazil squad which took part in the 1998 World Cup, the 1998 CONCACAF Gold Cup, and which won the 1997 FIFA Confederations Cup. During the 1998 World Cup Baiano played a key role in the Brazil squad which reached the 1998 FIFA World Cup Final in Paris, although in the match against Norway which Brazil lost 2–1, he lost a "trial of strength" with Tore André Flo immediately before the striker hit the ball beyond the reach of Claudio Taffarel to equalize, and also fouled the same player a few minutes later, which resulted in the awarding of a penalty kick, from which the Norwegians scored the decisive goal.

Career statistics
Scores and results list Brazil's goal tally first, score column indicates score after each Júnior Baiano goal.

Honours
Campeonato Carioca: 1991, 2004
Copa do Brasil: 1990
Campeonato Brasileiro: 1992, 2000
Copa Conmebol: 1994
Recopa Sul-Americana: 1994
Copa Mercosur: 1998, 2000
Copa Libertadores: 1999

Brazil
FIFA Confederations Cup: 1997

Individual
kicker Bundesliga Team of the Season: 1995–96
Bola de Prata: 1997

References

External links

1970 births
Living people
People from Feira de Santana
Brazilian footballers
Brazilian football managers
Association football defenders
Brazil international footballers
Brazilian expatriate footballers
Expatriate footballers in Germany
Brazilian expatriate sportspeople in Germany
Expatriate footballers in China
Brazilian expatriate sportspeople in China
Expatriate soccer players in the United States
Brazilian expatriate sportspeople in the United States
1997 FIFA Confederations Cup players
1998 CONCACAF Gold Cup players
1998 FIFA World Cup players
Copa Libertadores-winning players
FIFA Confederations Cup-winning players
Campeonato Brasileiro Série A players
Bundesliga players
USL First Division players
CR Flamengo footballers
São Paulo FC players
SV Werder Bremen players
Sociedade Esportiva Palmeiras players
CR Vasco da Gama players
Shanghai Shenhua F.C. players
Sport Club Internacional players
America Football Club (RJ) players
Brasiliense Futebol Clube players
Volta Redonda FC players
Miami FC (2006) players
Santa Helena Esporte Clube managers
Itumbiara Esporte Clube managers
Sportspeople from Bahia